Fry Saddle is a narrow ice saddle at the head of Fry Glacier, about  west-southwest of Mount Douglas in Victoria Land, Antarctica. It was discovered in 1957 by the New Zealand Northern Survey Party of the Commonwealth Trans-Antarctic Expedition (1956–58) and named by them in association with Fry Glacier.

References

Mountain passes of Victoria Land
Scott Coast